Fr. Franz Hunolt S.J. (31 March 1691, at Siegen – 12 September 1746, at Trier) was a popular German Catholic priest and preacher.

Life
The name of this renowned preacher is spelled in various ways in the catalogues of the Society of Jesus—Humold, Hunoldt, and (usually) Hunolt. At the age of nine years he entered the Jesuit college of his native town and six years later he attended the Jesuit school at Cologne to study philosophy. Having completed the three years' course as master of arts, he entered the Society of Jesus there on 18 May. After a novitiate of two years at Trier he was sent to Geyst (near Münster, in Westphalia) for one year to prepare himself to teach. After this he taught in the gymnasium at Cologne and also at Aachen to the complete satisfaction of his superiors (summâ cum laude), being at the same time spiritual director of the junior Sodality. In this position he showed proofs of his remarkable oratorical talents. Having completed the theological course of four years and received Holy Orders, he should then have made his tertianship, or third year of probation, but was, during most of that period, employed in giving popular missions, so great had his reputation as a preacher already become. His next appointment was to the chair of logic at Coblenz, where he made his profession, 15 August 1724. It was not until after this year that he was able to follow his true vocation; he was assigned to the cathedral pulpit at Trier, and continued in that employment for nineteen years, to the satisfaction of his superiors, and the spiritual advancement of the city. Besides this he was much sought after as a confessor, and he also became chaplain of the city prison. His indefatigable activity required robust health, which, unfortunately, Hunolt had not. Chronic weakness of the heart rendered it impossible for him to preach; consequently, in 1743, he was transferred to the position of master of novices at Trier, and died there three years later.

Work
Hunolt's great collection of sermons is still widely used. No fewer than six folio editions of the original work appeared between 1740 and 1813. After the latter date, versions in more modern German began to be published; one in twenty-five volumes appeared at Ratisbon, 1842–47; another modern version appeared about the same time at Graz, in twenty-four volumes. There have been several editions of both the Ratisbon version and the Graz, while abridgements and selected sermons have frequently been published, and are frequently republished with much success. Universally esteemed, the work was translated in Dutch, French, and Polish; an English version in twelve volumes was completed in 1898.

Hunolt's idea was to treat the entire field of morals in his sermons thoroughly and completely. Each of the six volumes contains seventy-two sermons, and the various divisions in each volume are indicated by sub-titles, such as "The Christian Attitude towards Life"; "The Wicked Christian"; "The Penitent Christian"; "The Good Christian"; "The Last End of Christians"; "The Christian's Model". This prodigious mass of material is distributed most appropriately over the entire ecclesiastical year. How popular, and at the same time profound, Hunolt's expositions are, is best proved by the fact that numerous excerpts are included in all anthologies and textbooks of religious rhetoric as standard. A competent critic (Kraus) has eulogized Hunolt's sermons in the following words: "At a time when German pulpit oratory had degenerated into utter bad taste and brainless insipidity, these sermons are distinguished by noble simplicity, pure Christian sentiment, and genuine apostolic ideas no less than by the felicitous use of Holy Writ, abundance of thought and pregnant language." And finally, we must call attention to the cultural value of Hunolt's work especially for the district of Trier, inasmuch as we may gather therefrom a fairly correct picture of life in the Trier of his day.

References

Attribution

External links
 Collected Sermons of Fr. Francis Hunolt

1691 births
1746 deaths
18th-century German Jesuits
Prison chaplains
People from Siegen